Golsinda is a genus of longhorn beetles of the subfamily Lamiinae, containing the following species:

 Golsinda basicornis Gahan, 1894
 Golsinda basigranosa Breuning, 1938
 Golsinda corallina Pascoe, 1857
 Golsinda malaysiaca Yamasako & Makihara, 2011

References

Mesosini